MicroPower Technologies was a company based in San Diego, California, that developed solar-powered wireless video camera technology from 2008 until 2016. 

MicroPower was financially supported in 2008 by the angel investor network totally, Tech Coast Angels.

 In August 2013, MicroPower Technologies also announced $5.7M in new funding.

On January 9, 2012, MicroPower announced a $6.5 million round of investment which included funding by Motorola Solutions Venture Capital, the strategic investment arm of Motorola Solutions (NSYE:MSI).

MicroPower ceased daily operations on April 22, 2016, with assets, intellectual property, and prototypes to be sold or auctioned in the following weeks.

Awards 
In 2014, MicroPower won the American Technology Award for green technology.

MicroPower won the 2010 Telecom Council of Silicon Valley SPIFFY award for most disruptive technology.

The 2011 ASIS International (American Society for Industrial Security) show awarded MicroPower a "New Product of the Year Award" in the "Security Products" division.

MicroPower won the 18th annual Tech America San Diego 2011 award in the "communications technology" category.

Notes and references

External links
Official site.

Electronics companies established in 2008
Defunct technology companies based in California
2008 establishments in California
Electronics companies disestablished in 2016
2016 disestablishments in California